Andrew Walter Little (birth unknown – death unknown) was a Scottish rugby union and professional rugby league footballer.

Rugby union
He also played for Hawick RFC.

Rugby league
Little transferred to Wigan in 1905–6.

County Cup Final appearances
Jack Barton played Prop, i.e. number 3 (in a 15-player team), in Wigan's 0–0 draw with Leigh in the 1905 Lancashire County Cup Final during the 1905–06 season at Wheater's Field, Broughton, on Saturday 2 December 1905, but was replaced by Peter Vickers in the 8–0 victory over Leigh in the 1905 Lancashire County Cup Final replay during the 1905–06 season at Wheater's Field, Broughton, on Monday 11 December 1905.

References
 Bath, Richard (ed.) The Scotland Rugby Miscellany (Vision Sports Publishing Ltd, 2007 )

External links
Statistics at wigan.rlfans.com

Hawick RFC players
Place of birth missing
Place of death missing
Scotland international rugby union players
Scottish rugby league players
Scottish rugby union players
Wigan Warriors players
Year of birth missing
Year of death missing
Rugby articles needing expert attention
Rugby league players from Hawick
Rugby union players from Hawick